James K. A. Smith (born 1970) is a Canadian-American philosopher who is currently Professor of Philosophy at Calvin University, holding the Gary & Henrietta Byker Chair in Applied Reformed Theology & Worldview. He is the current editor-in-chief of the literary journal Image.

Early life and education

Smith was born on October 9, 1970, in Embro, Ontario. He completed his undergraduate studies at the University of Waterloo and Emmaus Bible College. He earned a Master of Philosophy degree in philosophical theology in 1995 at the Institute for Christian Studies where he studied under James Olthuis. He went on to receive a Doctor of Philosophy degree in 1999 from Villanova University where he was advised by John D. Caputo. After teaching for a short time at Loyola Marymount University, Smith accepted his current position at Calvin University.

He currently resides in Grand Rapids, Michigan, and is a senior fellow at the Trinity Forum.

Work

Smith’s scholarly work is undertaken at the interface between philosophy, theology, ethics, aesthetics, science, and politics. It draws from continental philosophy and is informed by a long Augustinian tradition of theological cultural critique, from Augustine of Hippo and John Calvin to Jonathan Edwards and Abraham Kuyper. As of this date, his stated interest is in bringing critical thought to bear on the practices of the church and the church's witness to culture, culminating in the need to interpret and understand what he has called "cultural liturgies".

As a former proponent of radical orthodoxy, Smith's claim is that it is actually theology or, more specifically, the story told by the church that is capable of modernism. His popular-level work aims to educate evangelicals regarding postmodernism and radical orthodoxy. Though he is critical of the emergent church movement, he is at the same time sympathetic to much that could be described as part  of that movement. A primary concern in his work is to expose certain  postmodern philosophical claims (and certain  ecclesial attempts to work with them) as not actually postmodern enough, pointing out instead that they too have accepted the agenda set by the enlightenment. This is seen in his warnings that the emergent tendency away from historic ecclesial tradition is a grave mistake, and that putting down roots, committing to a community for the long haul, and engaging the deep discourses within historic Christian orthodoxy are in fact the truly post- or counter-modern practices for the church today.

Given his training in continental philosophy and in the theology of the Reformed and Pentecostal traditions, his intellectual interests are a natural fit.  Smith's research topics range from the continental philosophy of religion to urban altruism to the relationship between science and theology.

Bibliography
(2000) The Fall of Interpretation: Philosophical Foundations for a Creational Hermeneutic. 
(2002) Speech and Theology: Language and the Logic of Incarnation.  
(2004) 101 Key Terms in Philosophy and Their Importance for Theology, with Kelly James Clark & Richard Lints. 
(2004) Introducing Radical Orthodoxy: Mapping a Post-secular Theology, foreword by John Milbank. 
(2004) translation of The Crossing of the Visible, by Jean-Luc Marion.
(2004) The Hermeneutics of Charity: Interpretation, Selfhood, and Postmodern Faith (festschrift for James Olthuis),  editor with Henry Isaac Venema. 
(2005) Jacques Derrida: Live Theory.  
(2005) Radical Orthodoxy and the Reformed Tradition: Creation, Covenant, and Participation, editor with James Olthuis. 
(2006) Hermeneutics at the Crossroads, editor with Bruce Ellis Benson & Kevin J. Vanhoozer.  
(2006) Who's Afraid of Postmodernism? Taking Derrida, Lyotard, and Foucault to Church, The Church and Postmodern Culture series. 
(2008) After Modernity? Secularity, Globalization, and the Reenchantment of the World, editor.  
(2009) The Devil Reads Derrida: and Other Essays on the University, the Church, Politics, and the Arts.  
(2009) Desiring the Kingdom: Worship, Worldview, and Cultural Formation, Cultural Liturgies series vol. 1.  
(2010) Thinking in Tongues: Pentecostal Contributions to Christian Philosophy.  
(2010) Science and the Spirit: A Pentecostal Engagement with the Sciences, editor with Amos Yong.  
(2010) Letters to a Young Calvinist: An Invitation to the Reformed Tradition.  
(2011) Teaching and Christian Practices: Reshaping Faith and Learning, editor with David I. Smith.  
(2012) The Fall of Interpretation: Philosophical Foundations for a Creational Hermeneutic, second edition.  
(2013) Imagining the Kingdom: How Worship Works, Cultural Liturgies series vol. 2. 
(2013) Discipleship in the Present Tense: Reflections on Faith and Culture. 
(2014) Who's Afraid of Relativism? Community, Contingency, and Creaturehood, The Church and Postmodern Culture series. 
(2014) How (Not) to Be Secular: Reading Charles Taylor. 
(2016) You Are What You Love: The Spiritual Power of Habit. 
(2017) Awaiting the King: Reforming Public Theology, Cultural Liturgies series vol. 3'. '(2019) On the Road with Saint Augustine: A Real-World Spirituality for Restless Hearts. 
(2022) How to Inhabit Time: Understanding the Past, Facing the Future, Living Faithfully Now. ISBN 1587435233

See also
 Cardus
 List of thinkers influenced by deconstruction
 Philosophy in Canada
 List of University of Waterloo people

References

External links

Christianity Today: What's So Radical About Orthodoxy? Review of Introducing Radical Orthodoxy: Mapping a Post-secular Theology, by Ashley Woodiwiss
Evangelicals Now: Introducing Radical Orthodoxy Response to a review of Introducing Radical Orthodoxy: Mapping a Post-secular Theology, by Paul Helm
Review/Summary of "Limited Inc/arnation" (PDF) Summary and review of Smith's essay in Hermeneutics at the Crossroads''.

1970 births
21st-century American male writers
21st-century American philosophers
21st-century Calvinist and Reformed theologians
21st-century Canadian male writers
21st-century Canadian philosophers
American Calvinist and Reformed theologians
American Charismatics
American philosophy academics
Calvin University faculty
Calvinist and Reformed philosophers
Canadian Calvinist and Reformed theologians
Christian continental philosophers and theologians
Living people
Loyola Marymount University faculty
People from Oxford County, Ontario
Philosophers from Michigan
Philosophers of social science
Political theologians
Postmodernists
University of Waterloo alumni
Villanova University alumni
Writers from Ontario